Wild Horse Island (Montana Salish: Čt'išeʔém, Kutenai: kwiⱡq̓anqmi), approximately  in size, is the largest island on Flathead Lake, the largest freshwater lake in Montana. Protected as a state park since 1977, the island near Big Arm Bay is home to abundant wildlife including bighorn sheep, mule deer, waterfowl, and bald eagles. It is managed by Montana Fish, Wildlife & Parks and lies within both the Flathead Indian Reservation and Lake County, Montana.

History 
For centuries, the Salish-Kootenai used the island to pasture horses and keep them from being stolen by other tribes. The island was part of the Flathead Indian Reservation from the reservation's creation in 1872 until 1904, when the island was divided into individual plots of land. A number of attempts were made towards agricultural development, but none succeeded.

Between 1910 and 1915, homesteaders on the island cut down much of the old growth trees and introduced non-native grasses and other plant species. These species have competed with and overtaken much of the short-grass prairie that herbivorous wildlife need to survive. This short grass prairie is one of the last remaining in Montana, and various animal species are controlled to preserve the grasses from over-pasturing and extinction. 

Two Bighorn sheep were introduced in 1939. , when two bighorns were brought from Lincoln County, a total of ten sheep have been relocated to the island. In 2014, the population was between 160 and 200 sheep, and Montana Fish, Wildlife, & Parks worked to relocate 59 sheep to other herds in Northwest Montana. Three of the top five bighorn sheep recorded by the Boone and Crockett Club during the three years 2015-2018 came from Wild Horse Island.

, the wild horse population was five mares and one gelding.

Geography

The island was formed by the Cordilleran Glacier, giving the island a varying topography. Meadows sprawl the western and southern shores, while grasslands cover the southeast. The northern side of the island has forests of Ponderosa pine and Douglas fir trees.

Climate
A study conducted over a 25-year span has shown the average yearly precipitation on Wild Horse Island to be . Overall, the island experiences below freezing temperatures about two thirds of the year.

Access 
Access is by boat only and for day-use only. There are 56 private lots on the island, about  each.

Gallery

References

Further reading

External links

Wild Horse Island State Park Montana Fish, Wildlife & Parks
Wild Horse Island State Park Trail Map Montana Fish, Wildlife & Parks

Landforms of Lake County, Montana
Lake islands of Montana
Protected areas established in 1977